Stockem is a village in the commune of Wincrange, in northern Luxembourg.  , the village has a population of 112.

Church 

The Catholic chapel is located on the main street in the center of town. It is dedicated to the Holy Cross, and its feast takes place on September 14.

Villages in Luxembourg
Wincrange